Berthold IV may refer to:

 Berthold IV, Duke of Zähringen (1125–1186)
 Berthold IV, Duke of Merania (died in 1204)